Punta Higuero Lighthouse, also known as Faro de Punta Higuero, is an historic lighthouse located in Rincón, Puerto Rico. The original building was built in 1892 by the Spanish government and was rebuilt in 1922 by the United States Coast Guard.

In 1892 the original light was built as a fixed white, 6th order dioptric station and had a  light beam. According to the Historic American Engineering Record, "Its Mediterranean appearance came from an elaborate combination of exposed and indented brick work in the facades—around doors and windows—and corners." The "castle" look was further emphasized by reddish stucco imitating stone-work on all facades and the very elaborate exposed brick cornice topped by a parapet built in lace-like brick-work. The lighthouse was severely damaged by the 1918 earthquake that struck the west part of the island.

The new light was placed in commission on January 12, 1922. The building suffered fire damage after the light was automated in 1933 and was later razed. The town of Rincón built El Faro Park around the lighthouse, a popular spot for surfing and whale watching.

Gallery

See also
List of lighthouses in Puerto Rico

References

External links

Historic American Engineering Record in Puerto Rico
Lighthouses completed in 1892
Lighthouses completed in 1922
Lighthouses on the National Register of Historic Places in Puerto Rico
1892 establishments in Puerto Rico
Spanish Colonial architecture in Puerto Rico
1922 establishments in Puerto Rico